Anastasia Guerra (born ) is an Italian volleyball player, playing as an opposite. She is part of the Italy women's national volleyball team.

She competed at the 2015 European Games in Baku. At club level she played for Club Italia in 2015.

Sporting achievements

Awards
 2013 Girls' Youth European Volleyball Championship - Most Valuable Player

Clubs

FIVB Club World Championship
  2016 - with Pomi Casalmaggiore

References

1996 births
Living people
Italian women's volleyball players
Place of birth missing (living people)
European Games competitors for Italy
Volleyball players at the 2015 European Games
21st-century Italian women